The Twilight Zone Companion is a book by Marc Scott Zicree published in 1982.

The Twilight Zone Companion is a book about the original The Twilight Zone series.

Reception
Dave Pringle reviewed The Twilight Zone Companion for Imagine magazine, and stated that it "is excellent value for anyone who holds the 25-year-old TV series in high esteem. It is a well-illustrated 447-page book. The solid text contains interviews with many of the writers and directors who worked on the series, including Richard Matheson."

Reviews
Review by Robert Coulson (1983) in Amazing Science Fiction, May 1983
Review by John DiPrete (1983) in Science Fiction Review, November 1983

References

Books about television
The Twilight Zone